Arthur Hogg may refer to:

Arthur Hogg (cricketer), English cricketer
Arthur Robert Hogg (1903–1966), Australian physicist and astronomer
Sir Arthur Hogg, 7th Baronet (1896–1995)

See also
Hogg (surname)